Anloga District is one of the eighteen districts in Volta Region, Ghana. Originally it was formerly part of the then-larger Keta District on 10 March 1989, which was created from the former Anlo District Council. However on 19 February 2019, the western part of the district was split off to create Anloga District as one of six districts inaugurated by the Akufo-Addo Government, thus the remaining part has been retained as Keta Municipal District. The district assembly is located in the southeast part of Volta Region and has Anloga as its capital town.

Populated places
The largest town in the district is the capital, Anloga. Some of the villages include Alakple, Kodzi, Dzita, Dewegodo,  Dewenu, Srogboe, Whuti, Atsito, Fiaxor, Deta, Genui, Benadzi, Azanu, Apklorfudzi, Tregui, Trekume, Bleamezado, Dosukorpe, Lividzi, Agortoe, Salo, Nyikutor, Atorkor, Woe, Tegbi, Afiadenyigba, Anyako, Abor, Weta, Aƒiƒe, Aŋloga, Anyaŋui, Tunu, Akplowotorkor, and Fuveme.

People
The main ethnic group in the Anloga District are the Ewe people. The main Ewe group are the Anlo Ewe. Their leader and king is the Awormefia of Anlo, Togbui Sri III.

Administration
The District administration is based at Anloga. The head of its administration is the District Chief Executive (DCE) who is appointed by the President of Ghana. The current DCE is Seth Yormenu.

External links
 Official Website
 Districts of Ghana at Statoids.com

References

Districts of Volta Region

States and territories established in 2019